Notermans is a surname. Notable people with the surname include:

 Emmanuel Noterman (1808–1863), Belgian painter and printmaker 
 Zacharie Noterman (1820–1890), Belgian painter and printmaker

See also
 Jan Notermans (1932–2017), Dutch football player and manager

Dutch-language surnames